Bernhard Mock (born 30 January 1945) is a German former swimmer. He competed in the men's 400 metre individual medley at the 1968 Summer Olympics.

References

External links
 

1945 births
Living people
German male swimmers
Olympic swimmers of West Germany
Swimmers at the 1968 Summer Olympics
People from Rhön-Grabfeld
Sportspeople from Lower Franconia
Male medley swimmers